The 18th Guldbagge Awards ceremony, presented by the Swedish Film Institute, honored the best Swedish films of 1981 and 1982, and took place on 10 October 1982. The Simple-Minded Murderer directed by Hans Alfredson was presented with the award for Best Film.

Awards
 Best Film: The Simple-Minded Murderer by Hans Alfredson
 Best Director: Hans Alfredson for The Simple-Minded Murderer
 Best Actor: Stellan Skarsgård for The Simple-Minded Murderer
 Best Actress: Sunniva Lindekleiv, Lise Fjeldstad and Rønnaug Alten for Little Ida
 Special Achievement: Ulf Dageby for Målaren
 The Ingmar Bergman Award: Gustav Roger

References

External links
Official website
Guldbaggen on Facebook
Guldbaggen on Twitter
18th Guldbagge Awards at Internet Movie Database

1982 in Sweden
1982 film awards
Guldbagge Awards ceremonies
October 1982 events in Europe
1980s in Stockholm